Anthuan Maybank (born December 30, 1969) is a retired 1996 Olympic Games gold medalist in the men's 4x400 meter relay for the United States. Maybank ran the last leg for the United States and shrugged off an attack from Roger Black (UK) who had won a silver medal in the individual event. Maybank was not a well-known athlete at the time. But, a few weeks later, he confirmed his talent by winning the 400 m race at the prestigious meeting in Zurich.
Anthuan was born in Georgetown, South Carolina. He was coached by "Sweet" Freddie Young at Georgetown High where he set the current state record in the 400 m (46.67), He attended the University of Iowa on a full athletic scholarship. He currently resides in Delaware and is the sprint coach for the Tatnall School.

See also
 World Fit

References

 Anthuan Maybank profile at USATF
 

1969 births
Living people
American male sprinters
Athletes (track and field) at the 1996 Summer Olympics
Olympic gold medalists for the United States in track and field
People from Georgetown, South Carolina
Track and field athletes from South Carolina
Medalists at the 1996 Summer Olympics
Iowa Hawkeyes men's track and field athletes
Universiade medalists in athletics (track and field)
Universiade gold medalists for the United States
Medalists at the 1995 Summer Universiade